The First Nation Screaming Eagles were a Canadian Junior ice hockey team based in Thunder Bay, Ontario.  They played in the Thunder Bay Junior B Hockey League and were eligible to compete for the Keystone Cup, Junior B Championship of Western Canada.

History
The First Nation Screaming Eagles joined the Thunder Bay Junior B Hockey League in 2010.

In their first season, they finished fourth out of four teams in the Thunder Bay League and lost their semi-final against the eventual champion Thunder Bay Northern Hawks in 3-games-straight.

On word that the league was expanding, the Eagles elected to fold after only one season instead of incurring more travel costs.

Season-by-season standings

External links
Screaming Eagles Site

2010 establishments in Ontario
2011 disestablishments in Ontario
Defunct Lakehead Junior Hockey League teams
Sport in Thunder Bay